Pleistocene Park is a nature reserve on the Kolyma River south of Chersky in the Sakha Republic, Russia, in northeastern Siberia, where an attempt is being made to re-create the northern subarctic steppe grassland ecosystem that flourished in the area during the last glacial period.

The project is being led by Russian scientists Sergey Zimov and Nikita Zimov, testing the hypothesis that repopulating with large herbivores (and predators) can restore rich grasslands ecosystems, as expected if overhunting, and not climate change, was primarily responsible for the extinction of wildlife and the disappearance of the grasslands at the end of the Pleistocene epoch.

The aim of the project is to research the climatic effects of the expected changes in the ecosystem. Here the hypothesis is that the change from tundra to grassland will result in a raised ratio of energy emission to energy absorption of the area, leading to less thawing of permafrost and thereby less emission of greenhouse gases. It is also thought that removal of snow by large herbivores will further reduce the permafrost's insulation.

To study this, large herbivores have been released, and their effect on the local fauna is being monitored. Preliminary results point at the ecologically low-grade tundra biome being converted into a productive grassland biome and at the energy emission of the area being raised.

Research goals

Effects of large herbivores on the arctic tundra/grasslands ecosystem 
The primary aim of Pleistocene Park is to recreate the mammoth steppe (ancient taiga/tundra grasslands that were widespread in the region during the last ice age). The key concept is that animals, rather than climate, maintained that ecosystem. Reintroducing large herbivores to Siberia would then initiate a positive feedback loop promoting the reestablishment of grassland ecosystems. This argument is the basis for rewilding Pleistocene Park's landscape with megafauna that were previously abundant in the area, as evidenced by the fossil record.

The grassland-steppe ecosystem that dominated Siberia during the Pleistocene disappeared 10,000 years ago and was replaced by a mossy and forested tundra and taiga ecosystem.  Concurrently, most of the large herbivores that roamed Siberia during the Pleistocene have vanished from the region. The mainstream explanation for this used to be that at the beginning of the Holocene the arid steppe climate changed into a humid one, and when the steppe vanished so did the steppe's animals. Sergei Zimov points out that in contradiction to this scenario:
 Similar climatic shifts occurred in previous interglacial periods without causing such massive environmental changes.
 Those large herbivores of the former steppe that survived until today (e.g. musk oxen, bison, horses) thrive in humid environments just as well as in arid ones.
 The climate (both temperatures and humidity) in today's northern Siberia is in fact similar to that of the mammoth steppe. The radiation aridity index for northern Siberia on Mikhail Budyko's scale is 2 (= steppe bordering on semi-desert). Budyko's scale compares the ratio of the energy received by the earth's surface to the energy required for the evaporation of the total annual precipitation. The 'humid climate' argument was based on other scales, which compare precipitation to potential evapotranspiration. Moss has a very low transpiration rate and thus causes humidity without necessarily needing humidity for its establishment. Using these other scales as a proof for humidity being the cause of the disappearance of the grasslands therefore constitutes a circular argument, which is not scientifically viable. 

Zimov and colleagues argue for a reversed order of environmental change in the mammoth steppe. Humans, with their constantly improving technology, overhunted the large herbivores and led to their extinction and extirpation. Without herbivores grazing and trampling over the land, mosses, shrubs and trees were able to take over and replace the grassland ecosystem. If the grasslands were destroyed because herbivore populations were decimated by human hunting, then "it stands to reason that those landscapes can be reconstituted by the judicious return of appropriate herbivore communities."

Effects of large herbivores on permafrost and global warming 

A secondary aim is to research the climatic effects of the expected changes in the ecosystem. Here the key concept is that some of the effects of the large herbivores, such as eradicating trees and shrubs or trampling snow, will result in a stronger cooling of the ground in the winter, leading to less thawing of permafrost during summer and thereby less emission of greenhouse gases.

Permafrost is a large global carbon reservoir that has remained frozen throughout much of the Holocene. Due to recent climate change, the permafrost is beginning to thaw, releasing stored carbon and forming thermokarst lakes. When the thawed permafrost enters the thermokarst lakes, its carbon is converted into carbon dioxide and methane and released into the atmosphere. Methane is a potent greenhouse gas and the methane emissions from thermokarst lakes have the potential to initiate a positive feedback cycle in which increased atmospheric methane concentrations lead to amplified global climate change, which in turn leads to more permafrost thaw and more methane and carbon dioxide emissions.

As the combined carbon stored in the world's permafrost (1670 Gt) equals about twice the amount of the carbon currently released in the atmosphere (720 Gt), the setting in motion of such a positive feedback cycle could potentially lead to a runaway climate change scenario. Even if the ecological situation of the arctic were as it was 400,000 years ago (i.e., grasslands instead of tundra), a global temperature rise of 1.5 °C (2.7 °F) relative to the pre-industrial level would be enough to start the thawing of permafrost in Siberia. An increased cooling of the ground during winter would raise the current tipping point, potentially delaying such a scenario.

Implementation

Background: regional Pleistocene ecoregions 

It has been proposed that the introduction of a variety of large herbivores will recreate their ancient ecological niches in Siberia and regenerate the Pleistocene terrain with its different ecological habitats such as taiga, tundra, steppe and alpine terrain.

The main objective, however, is to recreate the extensive grasslands that covered the Beringia region in the late Pleistocene. This form of grassland (also known as mammoth steppe) was inhabited by a diverse set of large and medium herbivores. Back in the Pleistocene the area was populated by many species of grazers that assembled in large herds similar in size to those in Africa and Asia today. Species that roamed the great grasslands included the woolly mammoth, woolly rhino, steppe wisent, Lena Horse, muskox, and reindeer.

Another herbivore that was abundant in this region during the Pleistocene but now faces possible extinction in its remaining habitats is the saiga antelope, which can form massive herds that keep the vegetation down.

At the edges of these large stretches of grassland could be found more shrub-like terrain and dry conifer forests (similar to taiga). In this terrain the browsers of the Pleistocene were to be found. This group of megafauna included woolly rhinoceros, moose, wapiti, Yukon wild ass, and camels. The more mountainous terrain was occupied by several species of mountain-going animals like the snow sheep.

During the Pleistocene there was a great variety of carnivorous mammals as well. On the plains there were prides of Beringian cave lion. These large cats were the apex predators of the region, but also shared their habitat with other predators such as grey wolf, cave hyena, Homotherium, brown bear, wolverine, and Arctic fox, which all occupied a distinct ecological niche essential for the balance of their respective ecosystems.

On the edges of the grasslands (in the shrubs and forests) there were also brown bears, wolverines, cave bears, lynxes, tigers, leopards, and red foxes. The Siberian tiger and Amur leopard occupied the southern part of the steppe biome and surviving populations are still found along the present Russian-Sino border in the Amur and Primorye regions.

Proposed procedure 
In present-day Siberia only a few of the former species of megafauna are left; and their population density is extremely low, too low to affect the environment. To reach the desired effects, the density has to be raised artificially by fencing in and concentrating the existing large herbivores. A large variety of species is important as each species affects the environment differently and as the overall stability of the ecosystem increases with the variety of species (compare  Biodiversity and ecological services). Their numbers will be raised by reintroducing species that became locally extinct (e.g., muskoxen). For species that became completely extinct, suitable replacements will be introduced if possible (e.g., wild Bactrian camels for the extinct Pleistocene camels of the genus Paracamelus). As the number of herbivores increases, the enclosure will be expanded.

While this is taking place, the effects will be monitored. This concerns for example the effects on the flora (are the mosses being replaced by grasses, etc.), the effects on the atmosphere (changes in levels of methane, carbon dioxide, water vapor) and the effects on the permafrost.

Finally, once a high density of herbivores over a vast area has been reached, predators larger than the wolves will have to be introduced to keep the megafauna in check.

Progress and plans 
1988–1996
The first grazing experiments began in 1988 at the Northeast Science Station in Chersky with Yakutian horses.

1996–2004
In 1996 a 50 ha (125 acre) enclosure was built in Pleistocene Park. As a first step in recreating the ancient landscape, the Yakutian horses were introduced, as horses had been the most abundant ungulates on the northeastern Siberian mammoth steppe. Of the first 40 horses, 15 were killed by predators and 12 died of eating poisonous plants. More horses were imported, and they learned to cope with the environment. In 2006 approximately 20 horses lived in the park, and by 2007 more horses were being born annually than died. By 2013, the number had risen to about 30. Moose, already present in the region, were also introduced. The effects of large animals (mammoths and  wisents) on nature were artificially created by using an engineering tank and an 8 wheel drive Argo all-terrain vehicle to crush pathways through the willow shrub.

The vegetation in the park started to change. In the areas where the horses grazed, the soil has been compacted and mosses, weeds and willow shrub were replaced by grasses. Flat grassland is now the dominating landscape inside the park. The permafrost was also influenced by the grazers. When air temperature sank to −40 °C (−40 °F) in winter, the temperature of the ground was found to be only –5 °C (+23 °F) under an intact cover of snow, but −30 °C (−22 °F) where the animals had trampled down the snow. The grazers thus help keep permafrost intact, thereby lessening the amount of methane released by the tundra.

2004–2011
In the years 2004–2005 a new fence was erected, creating an enclosure of 16 km2 (6 sq mi).

The new enclosure finally allowed a more rapid development of the project. After the fence was completed, reindeer were brought into the park from herds in the region and are now the most numerous ungulates in the park. To increase moose density in the park, special constructions were added to the fence in several places that allow animals outside the fenced area to enter the park, while not allowing them to leave. Besides that, wild moose calves were caught in other regions and transported to the park.

In 2007 a 32 meter (105 foot) high tower was erected in the park that constantly monitors the levels of methane, carbon dioxide and water vapor in the park's atmosphere.

In September 2010, 6 male muskox from Wrangel Island were reintroduced, but 2 muskoxen died in the first months: one from unknown causes, and the other from infighting among the muskoxen. Seven months later, in April 2011, 6 Altai wapiti and 5 wisents arrived at the park, the wapiti were from the Altai mountains and the wisents from Prioksko-Terrasny Nature Reserve, near Moscow. The enclosing fence proved too low for the wapiti, and by the end of 2012 all 6 had jumped the fence and run off.

2011–2016
In the years 2011–2016 progress slowed down as most energy was put into the construction of a 150 ha (370 ac) branch of Pleistocene Park near the city of Tula in Tula Oblast in Europe, see below (Wild Field section). A few more reindeer and moose were introduced into Pleistocene Park during this time, and a monitoring system for measuring the energy balance (ratio of energy emission and energy absorption) of the pasture was installed.

2017–present
Attention has now been shifted back to the further development of Pleistocene Park. A successful crowdfunding effort in early 2017 provided funding for further animal acquisitions. Later that year 12 domestic yak and 30 domestic sheep were brought to the park. and the introduction of more muskoxen was planned for 2020.

For the near future the focus in animal introductions will generally be placed on browsers, not grazers, i.e., bison, muskoxen, horses, and domestic yaks. Their role in this phase will be to diminish the amount of shrubs and trees and enlarge the grassy areas. Only when these areas have sufficiently increased will grazers like saiga and wild Bactrian camels  be introduced.

Reception

Controversial aspects 
Critics admonish that introducing alien species could damage the fragile ecosystem of the existing tundra. To this criticism Sergey Zimov replied: "The tundra is not an ecosystem. Such systems had not existed on the planet [before the disappearance of the megafauna], and there is nothing to cherish in the tundra. Of course, it would be silly to create a desert instead of the tundra, but if the same site would evolve into a steppe, then it certainly would improve the environment. If deer, foxes, bovines were more abundant, nature would only benefit from this. And people too. However, the danger still exists, of course, you have to be very careful. If it is a revival of the steppes, then, for example, small animals are really dangerous to release without control. As for large herbivores – no danger, as they are very easy to remove again."

Another point of concern is doubt that the majority of species can be introduced in such harsh conditions. For example, according to some critics, the Yakutian horses, although they have been living in the park for several generations, would not have survived without human intervention. They normally tolerate –60 °C, but are said to cope poorly with an abundance of snow and possibly would have died of starvation in the first snowy winter. However, horses of much less primitive stock abandoned by the Japanese Army have been living feral on some uninhabited Kuril Islands since 1945. Despite the deep snows (two to three times deeper than in Yakutia), they have successfully survived all the winters without feeding. And in Pleistocene Park, while some of the Yakutian horses accept supplementary feeding, others keep away and survive on their own.

Positive reception 
The Zimovs' concept of Pleistocene Park and repopulating the mammoth steppe is listed as one of the “100 most substantive solutions to global warming” by Project Drawdown.  The list, encompassing only technologically viable, existing solutions, was compiled by a team of over 200 scholars, scientists, policymakers, business leaders and activists; for each solution the carbon impact through the year 2050, the total and net cost to society, and the total lifetime savings were measured and modelled.

In January 2020, a study co-authored by Nikita Zimov and three  University of Oxford researchers assessed the viability of the park's goals when implemented on a larger scale. It was estimated that if three large-scale experimental areas were set up, each containing 1000 animals and costing 114 million US dollars over a ten year period, that 72,000 metric tons of carbon could be held and generate 360,000 US dollars in carbon revenues.

Visitors 
The park is a hub for international scientists and students, who come from around the world to conduct their own ecological research and experiments. The Polaris Project was a yearly visitor from 2009 to 2015, sending American students on excursions to the park each summer.

Another group of visitors are journalists. The park is steadily gaining more media attention and while most journalists do not come to the park itself the number of visitors is increasing. In 2016 for example, the park was visited by a filmmaker, two print media (Swiss 24 Heures and American The Atlantic), and two TV broadcasting companies (German ARD and American HBO).

The total of visitors for 2016 (summer months only) was 45.

Size and administration 
Pleistocene Park is a 160 km2 scientific nature reserve (zakaznik) consisting of willow brush, grasslands, swamps, forests and a multitude of lakes. The average temperature in January is about –33 °C and in July +12 °C; annual precipitation is 200–250 mm.

Pleistocene Park is owned and administered by a non-profit corporation, the Pleistocene Park Association, consisting of the ecologists from the Northeast Science Station in Chersky and the Grassland Institute in Yakutsk. The present park area was signed over to the association by the state and is exempt from land tax. The reserve is surrounded by a 600 km2 buffer zone that will be added to the park by the regional government once the animals have successfully established themselves.

Hitherto Pleistocene Park had been financed solely through the funds of the founders, a practice that grew increasingly insufficient.

Animals

Animals already present in the park

Herbivores

 Reindeer (Rangifer tarandus): Present before the project started (although more are being brought to help simulate Pleistocene conditions). They mainly graze in the southern highlands of the park. This territory is not affected by spring flooding and dominated by larch forests and shrubland. Reindeer rarely visit the flood plain. Besides actively grazing (especially in winter) they browse on willow shrubs, tree moss, and lichens. (Numbers in park in November 2021: 20–30)
 Elk[BE]/moose[AE] (Alces alces): Present before the project started, although in low numbers. Immigration from neighboring areas is stimulated. Due to poaching the density of moose in the region has substantially decreased in the last 20 years. To increase moose density in the park, special constructions were added to the fence in several places that allow animals outside the fenced area to enter the park, while not allowing them to leave. Besides that, wild moose calves are being caught in other regions and transported to the park. It is the largest extant species of the deer family and one of the largest herbivores in the park today. (Numbers in park in November 2021: 5–15)
 Yakutian horse (a domestic breed of horse): The first species to be introduced for the project, they were imported from the surrounding Srednekolymsk region beginning in 1988. Yakutian horses have developed a range of remarkable morphologic, metabolic and physiologic adaptions to the harsh environment of Siberia, including an extremely dense and long winter coat, a compact build, a metabolism adjusted to seasonal needs, and an increased production of antifreezing compounds. In summer they grow very large hooves, which they wear down in winter scraping away snow to get at food. Despite their size, they proved to be dominant over the wisents, who often fled from them. Yakutian horses are purely grazing animals – they eat only grass species and visit the park's forests only during the spring flood. In the spring of 2015, ten more Yakutian horses were acquired to increase genetic diversity. (Numbers in park in November 2021: approximately 40)

 Muskox (Ovibos moschatus): Muskoxen arrived at the park in September 2010. They were brought from Wrangel Island (itself repopulated with animals from Canada). They are doing well and are now fully grown. Unfortunately only males could be acquired, after an attempt to get both males and females was thwarted during the expedition when a polar bear broke the fence to eat one of them, and the Zimovs are now urgently looking for females. The introduction of more muskoxen was planned for 2019. (Numbers in park in November 2021: 3 males) A new expedition to go to Wrangel Island was planned to take place in late 2020, but ultimately cancelled due to various delays by the time they had the boats ready, including by the COVID-19 pandemic. 
 Wisent (AKA European bison, Bison bonasus): During the last ice age, wisents were the most cold-adapted of the Bison species and thrived in the glacial grassland-steppe biome.  Their dietary needs are very different from the American bison. Year-round 10% of their diet necessarily consists of trees and shrubs, and they will ignore their main forage (grasses, sedges and forbs) in favour of woody forage to reach this quota. Without supplementary feeding in winter, the yearly average may rise to 20% even in countries with mild winters. Five wisents, one adult male and four juvenile females, were introduced in the park in April 2011. The wisents were brought to the park from the Prioksko-Terrasny Nature Reserve near Moscow. The transportation was more complicated and took a longer time than originally thought, but all the animals recovered rapidly after the trip. Unfortunately, the wisents did not sufficiently acclimatize in the first months. They started to moult in November, when temperatures already were down to –30 °C (–35 °F) in Cherskii. The four juveniles died; only the adult bull survived. He is now fully acclimatized. (Numbers in park in November 2021: 1 male)

 Domestic yak (Bos mutus grunniens): Ten domestic yaks acquired in Irkutsk Oblast were introduced in Pleistocene Park in June 2017; two calves were born a few days after the arrival. Another calf was born after that. Yaks are adapted to extreme cold, short growing seasons for grazing herbage, and rough grazing conditions with sedges and shrubby plants. Wild yaks once lived in western Beringia. (Numbers in park in November 2021: approximately 8)
 Edilbaevskaya sheep (a domestic breed of sheep): 30 domestic sheep acquired in Irkutsk Oblast were introduced in Pleistocene Park in October 2017. The sheep are from a breed that is adapted to the Siberian cold. They belong to the breed group of fat-tailed sheep; their fatty rump evolved to store fat as a reserve for lean seasons, analogous to a camel's humps. (Numbers in park in November 2021: 18)
 Kalmykian cattle (a domestic breed of cattle adapted for the Mongolian steppe): A population was introduced to the park in October 2018. (Numbers in park in November 2021: 15)
 Plains bison (Bison bison bison): Twelve yearling plains bison, nine males and three females, were acquired and would have been introduced in the park once the United States’ FAA gave clearance for the flight. The plains bison were bought from the Stevens Village Bison Reserve near Delta Junction in Alaska; as the climate there is comparable to that of Siberia, the young bison were expected to thrive. Plains bison are grazers of grasses and sedges. Unlike wisents, plains bison are almost pure grazers, which will consume other plant material mainly in time of need. While wood bison were the preferred choice of subspecies, they are not easy to acquire; plains bison simply are the subspecies that could be brought to the Park most easily. They got bison from Denmark, from the Ditlevsdal bison farm. The bison began travelling on 7 May, and officially arrived safely in the park on 9 June. A second expedition to the Ditlevsdal bison farm allowed for another herd to be brought to the park. (Numbers in park in November 2021: 24)
 Orenburg fur goat (Capra aegagrus hircus): Its presence is necessary due to their ability to eat anything, including plant poisonous to other herbivores. Only difficulty with acquiring them is due to them being only found in Orenburg, due to veterinary services not allowing shipping out of that region. Current plans involve bringing the goats from a farm belonging to a park ranger that formerly worked for Pleistocene Park into the park around May 2021. The trip to acquire them began on May 5, with the goats being loaded on May 8, then the long trek to bring them to Pleistocene Park finished with their arrival at the park on June 18. (Numbers in park in November 2021: 35)
 Bactrian camel (Camelus bactrianus): Either of the two-humped camel species could act as a proxy for extinct Pleistocene camel species, whose fossils have been found in areas that once formed part of Beringia. The camel evolved in the high arctic as a large boreal browser; its hump presumably evolved to store fat as a resource for the long winter. Bactrian camels will eat almost anything, preferably any plant material such as grass, shrubs, bark, etc., but in times of need also carrion. In the winter they will dig under snow to get at forage. Camels are not suitable for wet environments, preferring uplands, and are mainly sought out in order to browse away at plants like willow shrubs, though they do sometimes eat the wet grasses. Domesticated Bactrian camels are currently set to be brought to the park around May 2021 from a farm in Orsk. The trip to acquire them began on May 5, with the camels being loaded on May 8, and then the expedition would wrap up with the transport truck carrying the camels arriving at Pleistocene Park on June 18. (Numbers in park in November 2021: 10)
 Several non-ungulate herbivores were already present before establishment of the park and remain resident; these include the mountain hare (Lepus timidus), the black-capped marmot (Marmota camtschatica), the Arctic ground squirrel (Spermophilus parryii), the muskrat (Ondatra zibethicus), and diverse species of voles.

Carnivores
 Eurasian lynx (Lynx lynx): Resident before the project started. It is an important predator of medium-sized herbivores like hares and roe deer.
 Tundra wolf (Canis lupus albus): Before the project started the area was already home to a family of wolves, despite the originally low concentration of prey ungulates. This arctic subspecies of the gray wolf is widespread from northern Scandinavia to the Kamchatka Peninsula.
 Arctic fox (Vulpes lagopus): Resident before the project started. Well adapted to living in the arctic environment, its fur changes color with the season: white in winter, brown in summer.

 Eurasian brown bear (Ursus arctos arctos): Resident before the project started. Currently the largest predator in the region.
 Wolverine (Gulo gulo): Present before the project started. A stocky and muscular carnivore, the wolverine is a powerful and versatile predator and scavenger.
 Red fox (Vulpes vulpes): Resident before the project started. Red foxes are omnivores with a highly varied diet. From research conducted in the former Soviet Union, they are known to consume up to 300 animal species, mostly rodents and small lagomorphs, and a few dozen plant species.
 Sable (Martes zibellina): Resident before the project started.
 Stoat (Mustela erminea): Resident before the project started.

Animals considered for reintroduction

Herbivores
 Wood bison (Bison bison athabascae): Better adapted to life in the Far North than the plains bison. Mainly a grazer of grasses and sedges, seasonally supplements this diet with other plant material like forbs, lichen, and silverberry and willow leaves. Wet meadows in bottomlands (like the Kolyma river plain) are an important habitat for wood bison. The original plans for the rewilding of Bison had called for the introduction of wood bison as an ecological proxy for the extinct steppe wisent, Bison priscus. These plans did not work out and wisents were acquired instead.

 Altai wapiti or Altai maral (Cervus canadensis sibiricus): Had been introduced in April 2011. The wapiti made their way to the park all the way from the mountainous regions of Altai in central southern Siberia. Wapiti are very good jumpers and all six escaped within the first two years. The fence has been strengthened to cope with future introductions.
 Wild yak (Bos mutus): Could be brought from the Tibetan Plateau. Along with the bison, horse, and reindeer, the species could contribute to the further proliferation of grasses in the region.
 Snow sheep (Ovis nivicola): Immigration from neighboring areas is encouraged. Especially rams may be lured to the park by domestic ewes in rut.
 Wild Bactrian camel (Camelus ferus): Like the domesticated Bactrian camel, could act as a proxy for extinct Pleistocene camel species, whose fossils have been found in areas that once formed part of Beringia. The wild Bactrian camel is critically endangered and is only found in some few areas of China and Mongolia.
 Siberian roe deer (Capreolus pygargus): Immigration from neighboring areas is encouraged.

 Saiga antelope (Saiga tatarica): Introduction is in the planning stage. Its presence would be critical for the regulation of poisonous plants in the region that can be digested by the saiga but are harmful to other herbivores. Currently, free saigas can only be found in Russia in the Chyornye Zemli Nature Reserve.

Carnivores

 Siberian tiger (Panthera tigris tigris): Introduction planned for a later stage, when herbivores have multiplied. Endangered and reduced to the Primorye region. As the largest feline alive, the Siberian tiger could play a key role in regulating the numbers of the largest herbivores.

Animals that can be placed in the park if revived from extinction

 Woolly mammoth (Mammuthus primigenius): In January 2011, the Yomiuri Shimbun reported that a team of scientists from Kyoto University were planning to extract DNA from a mammoth carcass preserved in a Russian laboratory and insert it into egg cells of  Asian elephants in hope of creating a mammoth embryo. If the experiment succeeded, the calf would be taken to the park along with others to form a wild population. The researchers claimed that their aim was to produce the first mammoth within six years.
 Cave lion (Panthera spelaea): The discovery of two well-preserved cubs in the Sakha Republic ignited a project to clone the animal.
 Steppe bison (Bison priscus): The discovery of the mummified steppe bison of 9,000 years ago could help people clone the ancient bison species back, even though the steppe bison would not be the first to be "resurrected".
 Woolly rhinoceros (Coelodonta antiquitatis): Similar reasons of bringing back as the woolly mammoth.
 Irish elk (Megaloceros giganteus)
 Cave bear (Ursus spelaeus)

Southern branch of Pleistocene Park: The Wild Field wilderness reserve 

In 2012 to 2014 a branch of Pleistocene Park named "Wild Field" was constructed near the city of Tula in Tula Oblast in the European part of Russia, approximately 250 km (150 mi) south of Moscow.

Unlike Pleistocene Park, Wild Field's primary purpose is not scientific research but public outreach, i.e., it will provide a model of what an unregulated steppe ecosystem looked like before the advent of humans. It is situated near a federal road and a railway station and will be accessible to the general public.

Wild Field comprises 300 ha (740 ac) of which 280 ha have been fenced off and stocked with animals. Already present in the park are nine species of large herbivores and one omnivore species: Bashkir horses (a strain of Equus ferus caballus) from the southern part of the Ural Mountains, Altai maral/Altai wapiti (Cervus canadensis sibiricus), Edilbaevskaya sheep (a strain of Ovis orientalis aries), roe deer (Capreolus spec.), Kalmykian cattle (a strain of Bos primigenius taurus), domestic yaks (Bos mutus grunniens), wild boar (Sus scrofa), one female elk[BE]/moose[AE] (Alces alces), four reindeer (Rangifer tarandus) and 73 domestic Pridonskaya goats (a strain of Capra aegagrus hircus).

See also 

 Wild Field (wilderness reserve)
 Permafrost carbon cycle
 Quaternary extinction event
 Rewilding (conservation biology)

External links 
Successful Kickstarter campaign
Fundraiser at Indigogo
Ben Fogle: New Lives In The Wild, S11 E2: Siberia available online until 20 October 2022

Footnotes

References

Media 

 Official park website 
 PleistocenePark (Patreon)
 Official facebook site
 Official website of the Pleistocene Park Foundation (Last update April 2018)
 ″Wild Field″ Manifesto. Sergey A. Zimov, 2014.

Literature 
 Sergey A. Zimov (2005): ″Pleistocene Park: Return of the Mammoth's Ecosystem.″ In: Science, 6 May 2005, vol. 308, no. 5723, pp. 796–798. Accessed 5 May 2013..
 Aleksandr Markov (2006): ″Good Fence for Future Mammoth Steppes.″ Translated by Anna Kizilova. Russia-InfoCentre website, 21 January 2007. Accessed 5 May 2013..
 Sergei Zimov (2007): ″Mammoth Steppes and Future Climate.″ In: Science in Russia, 2007, pp. 105–112. Article found in: www.pleistocenepark.ru/en/ – Materials. Accessed 5 May 2013..
 Adam Wolf (2008): ″The Big Thaw.″ In: Stanford Magazine, Sept.–Oct. 2008, pp. 63–69. Accessed 7 May 2013.. – PDF of print version, found in: www.pleistocenepark.ru/en/ – Materials. Accessed 7 May 2013..
 Arthur Max (2010): ″Russian Scientist Working To Recreate Ice Age Ecosystem.″ In: The Huffington Post, 27 November 2010. Accessed 7 May 2013..
 Martin W. Lewis (2012): ″Pleistocene Park: The Regeneration of the Mammoth Steppe?″ and ″Pleistocene Re-Wilding: Environmental Restoration or Ecological Heresy?″ In: GeoCurrents, 12 respectively 14 April 2012. Accessed 2 May 2013..
 Sergey A. Zimov, Nikita S. Zimov, F. Stuart Chapin III (2012): “The Past and Future of the Mammoth Steppe Ecosystem.” (doi). In: Julien Louys (ed.), Paleontology in Ecology and Conservation, Berlin Heidelberg, Springer-Verlag 2012. Accessed 4 November 2017..
 S.A. Zimov, N.S. Zimov, A.N. Tikhonov, F.S. Chapin III (2012): ″Mammoth steppe: a high-productivity phenomenon.″ In: Quaternary Science Reviews, vol. 57, 4 December 2012, pp. 26–45. Accessed 10 February 2014..
 Damira Davletyarova (2013): ″The Zimovs: Restoration of the Mammoth-Era Ecosystem, and Reversing Global Warming.″ In: Ottawa Life Magazine, 11 February 2013. Accessed 6 June 2013..
 Eli Kintisch (2015): “Born to rewild. A father and son’s quixotic quest to bring back a lost ecosystem – and save the world.” In: Science, 4 December 2015, vol. 350, no. 6265, pp. 1148–1151. (Alternative version on the Pulitzer Center on Crisis Reporting website.) Accessed 26 September 2016..
 Ross Andersen (2017): “Welcome to Pleistocene Park. In Arctic Siberia, Russian scientists are trying to stave off catastrophic climate change—by resurrecting an Ice Age biome complete with lab-grown woolly mammoths.” In: The Atlantic, April 2017. Accessed 10 March 2017..
 Adele Peters (2017): “Home, home on the ферма. Meet The Father-Son Duo Importing American Bison To Siberia To Save The Planet.” In: Fast Company, 21 March 2017. Accessed 29 March 2017..
 Animal People, Inc. (2017): “An Interview with Nikita Zimov, Director of Pleistocene Park.” In: Animal People Forum, 2 April 2017.
 Noah Deich (2017): “Mammoths, Permafrost & Soil Carbon Storage: A Q&A about Pleistocene Park.” Interview with Dr. Guy Lomax of the Natural Climate Initiative at The Nature Conservancy. Center for Carbon Removal, 3 April 2017.

Video 
 Pleistocene Park (w/o date): 360° panorama view from top of the monitoring tower. Photo in Pleistocene Park Picture Gallery. Accessed 20 October 2014..
 R. Max Holmes (2011): An Arctic Solution to Climate Warming. Talk at the TEDxWoodsHole, 2 March 2011, in Woods Hole, Mass. Video, 9:17 min., uploaded 18 November 2011. Accessed 10 March 2017..
 Eugene Potapov (2012): Pleistocene Park. Video, 7:11 min., uploaded 21 October 2012. Accessed 23 April 2013..
 Panoramio (2012): A view of the Kolyma River floodplains taken from the surrounding hills above Pleistocene Park. Photo, uploaded 23 October 2012. Accessed 27 June 2013..
 Luke Griswold-Tergis (2014): Can Woolly Mammoths Save the World? Talk at the TEDxConstitutionDrive 2014 (Menlo Park, CA).] Video, 15:25 min., uploaded 29 May 2014. Accessed 20 October 2014..
 Grant Slater, Ross Andersen (2016): Creating Pleistocene Park. Video, 26:01 min., uploaded 13 March 2017. Accessed 6 April 2017..
 The Pleistocene Park Foundation, Inc. (2017): Pleistocene Park: an ice-age ecosystem to save the world. Video, 3:09 min. Kickstarter crowdfunding campaign. Accessed 4 March 2017..
 ZoominTV (2017) Jurassic Park IRL: How the mammoth can help our future. Video, 3:25 min., uploaded 10 July 2017. Note: This video shows Wild Field footage cut against an interview about Pleistocene Park.Accessed 6 April 2017..
Barbara Lohr (2017): Siberia: Raiders of the Lost Age. Video, 36 min. ARTE Reportage.
 Atlas Pro (2021): The Plan to Revive the Mammoth Steppe to Fight Climate Change. Video, 20 min.

External links 

 Official website
 Pleistocene Park Foundation
 Revive & Restore. Genetic Rescue for Endangered and Extinct Species. – Search results for “Zimov”

1988 establishments in Russia
1996 establishments in Russia
Protected areas established in 1988
Protected areas established in 1996
Nature reserves in Russia
Geography of the Sakha Republic
Protected areas of the Russian Far East
Wildlife sanctuaries of Asia
Paleoecology
Pleistocene Asia
Pleistocene extinctions
Ecological experiments
Animal reintroduction
Climate change mitigation
Permafrost
Rewilding
Siberian Tiger Re-population Project